Khuza'a is a Palestinian town in the Khan Yunis Governorate in the southern Gaza Strip. According to the Palestinian Central Bureau of Statistics, Khuza'a had a population of 9,700 inhabitants.

The town of Khuza'a is around 500 metres from the Green Line.

The families generally turn to custom to solve disputes amongst themselves.

History
In the 1945 statistics, Khuza'a (named Khirbat Ikhzaa), had a population of 990, all Muslims, with 8,179 dunams of land, according to an official land and population survey. Of this, 7,987 dunams were used for cereals, while 8 dunams were built-up land.

Allegations of war crimes in the 2008–09 war
The Observer collected allegations from residents that during the 2008–09 Gaza War, the Israeli military bulldozed houses in Khuza'a with civilians still inside and that civilians were shot despite carrying white flags. B'Tselem collected accounts from residents consistent with what The Observer reported.

Bruno Stevens, a Western journalist who was among the first to get access to Gaza, reported that white phosphorus was used in the shelling of houses. Stevens reported "What I can tell you is that many, many houses were shelled and that they used white phosphorus" and that "it appears to have been indiscriminate".

Killings and destruction of most homes in the 2014 war
During the 2014 Israel–Gaza conflict, most of the over 500 houses were destroyed when the Israeli military went in with their tanks.

Dozens of civilians were fired on and killed by the Israeli army during the ground offensive, according to human right groups, which some called "apparent violations of the laws of war". Witnesses said they were used as human shields by Israeli soldiers.

Helsingborgs Dagblad reported that the 5,000 residents fled after warning leaflets were dropped and most took refuge in UNRWA schools. Many residents were trapped because of Israeli shelling. Several Israeli soldiers said they were told Hamas had threatened to kill civilians who left their homes but this was "strongly denied" by more than a dozen residents of the town, who said Israel did not let them leave the fighting. Israeli soldiers said they, per instructions, fired warning shots to anyone who came close to them and then killed if they came closer. They also blamed Hamas' tactics, which they thought "made it impossible to determine who was or was not a threat". However, more than a dozen of Khuza'a residents, along with many more interviewed by human rights groups, said Israeli soldiers deliberately targeted them and their neighbors while they tried to flee.

See also
Rouzan al-Najjar

References

Bibliography

External links
Welcome To Kh. Khuza'a, Palestine Remembered
Khuza’a, ISM
Khuzaa: Attack and Aftermath, Al Jazeera
Khuza’a in Ruins, UNRWA

Towns in the Gaza Strip
Khan Yunis Governorate
Municipalities of the State of Palestine